Lazar Lemić (20 September 1937 – 16 February 2014) was a footballer. He capped twice for Yugoslavia.

At club level, he played with RFK Novi Sad and FK Željezničar Sarajevo in Yugoslavia, and Fenerbahçe S.K. in Turkey.

External links
 
 Profile at Serbian federation official site

1937 births
2014 deaths
Yugoslav footballers
Yugoslavia international footballers
RFK Novi Sad 1921 players
FK Željezničar Sarajevo players
Yugoslav First League players
Fenerbahçe S.K. footballers
Olympic footballers of Yugoslavia
Footballers at the 1964 Summer Olympics
Association football midfielders
Bosnia and Herzegovina football managers
Expatriate footballers in Turkey